Helen Balfour Morrison (August 1, 1900 – November 6, 1984) was an American photographer best known for her collaborations with dancer Sybil Shearer. Her work is in the collection of the Museum of Modern Art, the Chicago Film Archives, the Smithsonian Archives of American Art as well as many other institutions.

Personal life
Helen Balfour Morrison was born in Evanston, Illinois to Fannie Susan Lindley and Alexander Balfour. Morrison's mother died when she was 17. At age 16 Morrison took a job in a photography studio to help make ends meet.

Career
One of her first projects was a documentary series of photographs depicting African American life in Great Depression-era Kentucky. In a region near Lexington, she photographed the residents of the small communities of Zion Hill and Sugar Hill.

In her late twenties Morrison began the Great Americans series — portraits of such Chicago-area notables as Jane Addams, Nelson Algren, Saul Bellow, Amelia Earhart, Ludwig Mies van der Rohe, and Frank Lloyd Wright. However she also shot portraits of ordinary people. Morrison shot these portraits in Chicago and New York, and the series became well-known with exhibitions in museums all over the country. Critic J. B. Newman wrote that Morrison was able to "photograph the soul." 

In 1942, Morrison met dancer and choreographer Sybil Shearer. From that point forward, her work became more focused on documenting Shearer's life and work through an extraordinary production of photographs and films. As time went by, Morrison de-emphasized her own career to help manage and promote Shearer's affairs. The Morrison-Shearer Film Collection, which is administered by the Chicago Film Archives, contains over 400 16 mm films, nearly 200 8 mm films, and 200 quarter-inch audio reels.

Morrison-Shearer foundation
The Morrison-Shearer Foundation, was established in 1991 and is based in their home in Northbrook, Illinois.

References

External links 
Helen Balfour Morrison
Helen Balfour Morrison papers at The Newberry
Helen Balfour Morrison photograph collection at The Newberry
Helen Balfour Morrison photographs of Kentucky African American Communities at The Newberry

1900 births
1984 deaths
American people of Scottish descent
20th-century American photographers
Artists from Evanston, Illinois
American portrait photographers
Social realist artists
Social documentary photographers
20th-century American women photographers
Women photojournalists